The 2019 TNT KaTropa season was the 29th season of the franchise in the Philippine Basketball Association (PBA).

Draft picks

Roster

Philippine Cup

Eliminations

Standings

Game log

|-bgcolor=ffcccc
| 1
| January 13
| Barangay Ginebra
| L 79–90
| Roger Pogoy (21)
| Roger Pogoy (16)
| Jayson Castro (10)
| Philippine Arena23,711
| 0–1
|-bgcolor=ffcccc
| 2
| January 19
| Phoenix
| L 84–93 (OT)
| Roger Pogoy (30)
| Roger Pogoy (12)
| Castro, Heruela (4)
| Ynares Center
| 0–2
|-bgcolor=ccffcc
| 3
| January 23
| NLEX
| W 85–80
| Roger Pogoy (20)
| Pogoy, Taha, Trollano, Williams (7)
| Heruela, Reyes (4)
| Smart Araneta Coliseum
| 1–2
|-bgcolor=ccffcc
| 4
| January 27
| San Miguel
| W 104–93
| Jayson Castro (24)
| Roger Pogoy (10)
| Jayson Castro (11)
| Smart Araneta Coliseum
| 2–2
|-bgcolor=ffcccc
| 5
| January 30
| Meralco
| L 77–88
| Jayson Castro (20)
| Kelly Williams (15)
| Brian Heruela (5)
| Cuneta Astrodome
| 2–3

|-bgcolor=ccffcc
| 6
| February 3
| Magnolia
| W 80–75 (OT)
| Roger Pogoy (26)
| Kelly Williams (13)
| Jayson Castro (4)
| Mall of Asia Arena
| 3–3

|-bgcolor=ccffcc
| 7
| March 3
| Rain or Shine
| W 100–92
| Castro, Rosario (20)
| Castro, A. Semerad, Taha, Washington (7)
| Jayson Castro (10)
| Ynares Center
| 4–3
|-bgcolor=ccffcc
| 8
| March 9
| Blackwater
| W 127–89
| Roger Pogoy (28)
| Kelly Williams (7)
| Jericho Cruz (9)
| Ynares Center
| 5–3
|-bgcolor=ccffcc
| 9
| March 15
| Alaska
| W 92–78
| Roger Pogoy (24)
| Kelly Williams (11)
| Kelly Williams (9)
| Cuneta Astrodome
| 6–3
|-bgcolor=ccffcc
| 10
| March 22
| Columbian
| W 101–98
| Jayson Castro (20)
| Yousef Taha (10)
| Jayson Castro (7)
| Ynares Center
| 7–3
|-bgcolor=ffcccc
| 11
| March 24
| NorthPort
| L 83–109
| Don Trollano (15)
| Trollano, Williams (7)
| Jayson Castro (7)
| Smart Araneta Coliseum
| 7–4

Playoffs

Bracket

Game log

|-bgcolor=ffcccc
| 1
| April 6
| San Miguel
| L 78–80
| Troy Rosario (23)
| Rosario, Williams (9)
| Jayson Castro (7)
| Mall of Asia Arena
| 0–1
|-bgcolor=ccffcc
| 2
| April 8
| San Miguel
| W 93–88
| Roger Pogoy (20)
| Troy Rosario (12)
| Jayson Castro (9)
| Smart Araneta Coliseum
| 1–1
|-bgcolor=ffcccc
| 3
| April 10
| San Miguel
| L 86–96
| Roger Pogoy (16)
| Yousef Taha (13)
| Brian Heruela (4)
| Smart Araneta Coliseum11,147
| 1–2

Commissioner's Cup

Eliminations

Standings

Game log

|-bgcolor=ccffcc
| 1
| May 22
| NLEX
| W 102–87
| Terrence Jones (41)
| Terrence Jones (14)
| Jayson Castro (5)
| Ynares Center
| 1–0
|-bgcolor=ccffcc
| 2
| May 25
| Alaska
| W 99–85
| Terrence Jones (43)
| Terrence Jones (22)
| Terrence Jones (5)
| Smart Araneta Coliseum
| 2–0
|-bgcolor=ffcccc
| 3
| May 29
| NorthPort
| L 86–110
| Troy Rosario (22)
| Terrence Jones (14)
| Terrence Jones (5)
| Mall of Asia Arena
| 2–1

|-bgcolor=ccffcc
| 4
| June 2
| Phoenix
| W 114–88
| Terrence Jones (40)
| Jayson Castro (13)
| Jayson Castro (11)
| Ynares Center
| 3–1
|-bgcolor=ccffcc
| 4
| June 8
| San Miguel
| W 110–97
| Terrence Jones (30)
| Terrence Jones (18)
| Jayson Castro (15)
| Ynares Center
| 4–1
|-bgcolor=ccffcc
| 6
| June 12
| Barangay Ginebra
| W 104–96
| Roger Pogoy (37)
| Terrence Jones (14)
| Terrence Jones (16)
| Smart Araneta Coliseum
| 5–1
|-bgcolor=ccffcc
| 7
| June 15
| Meralco
| W 104–91
| Terrence Jones (49)
| Terrence Jones (18)
| Heruela, Jones (4)
| Smart Araneta Coliseum
| 6–1
|-bgcolor=ccffcc
| 8
| June 21
| Columbian
| W 109–102
| Terrence Jones (39)
| Terrence Jones (17)
| Castro, Jones (6)
| Cuneta Astrodome
| 7–1

|-bgcolor=ccffcc
| 9
| July 3
| Rain or Shine
| W 102–81
| Terrence Jones (33)
| Terrence Jones (21)
| Terrence Jones (13)
| Smart Araneta Coliseum
| 8–1
|-bgcolor=ccffcc
| 10
| July 7
| Blackwater
| W 115–97
| Terrence Jones (36)
| Terrence Jones (16)
| Terrence Jones (14)
| Smart Araneta Coliseum
| 9–1
|-bgcolor=ccffcc
| 11
| July 17
| Magnolia
| W 98–83
| Terrence Jones (26)
| Terrence Jones (13)
| Terrence Jones (8)
| Smart Araneta Coliseum
| 10–1

Playoffs

Bracket

Game log

|-bgcolor=ffcccc
| 1
| July 21
| Alaska
| L 72–108
| Jayson Castro (23)
| Jones, Trollano (6)
| Jayson Castro (3)
| Smart Araneta Coliseum
| 0–1
|-bgcolor=ccffcc
| 2
| July 24
| Alaska
| W 104–93
| Terrence Jones (37)
| Terrence Jones (22)
| Terrence Jones (9)
| Smart Araneta Coliseum
| 1–1

|-bgcolor=ccffcc
| 1
| July 26
| Barangay Ginebra
| W 95–92
| Jones, Rosario (24)
| Terrence Jones (12)
| Terrence Jones (7)
| Smart Araneta Coliseum
| 1–0
|-bgcolor=ccffcc
| 2
| July 28
| Barangay Ginebra
| W 88–71
| Jayson Castro (20)
| Terrence Jones (19)
| Terrence Jones (10)
| Smart Araneta Coliseum
| 2–0
|-bgcolor=ffcccc
| 3
| July 30
| Barangay Ginebra
| L 72–80
| Terrence Jones (24)
| Terrence Jones (18)
| Jayson Castro (7)
| Mall of Asia Arena
| 2–1
|-bgcolor=ccffcc
| 4
| August 1
| Barangay Ginebra
| W 103–92
| Terrence Jones (24)
| Terrence Jones (13)
| Terrence Jones (10)
| Smart Araneta Coliseum
| 3–1

|-bgcolor=ccffcc
| 1
| August 4
| San Miguel
| W 109–96
| Terrence Jones (41)
| Terrence Jones (12)
| Terrence Jones (8)
| Smart Araneta Coliseum
| 1–0
|-bgcolor=ffcccc
| 2
| August 7
| San Miguel
| L 125–127 (2OT)
| Troy Rosario (34)
| Terrence Jones (13)
| Jayson Castro (12)
| Smart Araneta Coliseum
| 1–1
|-bgcolor=ccffcc
| 3
| August 9
| San Miguel
| W 115–105
| Terrence Jones (37)
| Terrence Jones (18)
| Terrence Jones (9)
| Smart Araneta Coliseum
| 2–1
|-bgcolor=ffcccc
| 4
| August 11
| San Miguel
| L 101–106
| Terrence Jones (32)
| Terrence Jones (16)
| Jayson Castro (9)
| Smart Araneta Coliseum
| 2–2
|-bgcolor=ffcccc
| 5
| August 14
| San Miguel
| L 94–99
| Terrence Jones (35)
| Terrence Jones (17)
| Terrence Jones (8)
| Smart Araneta Coliseum
| 2–3
|-bgcolor=ffcccc
| 6
| August 16
| San Miguel
| L 94–99
| Terrence Jones (41)
| Terrence Jones (12)
| Jayson Castro (6)
| Smart Araneta Coliseum
| 2–4

Governors' Cup

Eliminations

Standings

Game log

|-bgcolor=ccffcc
| 1
| September 25
| Blackwater
| W 135–107
| K. J. McDaniels (41)
| K. J. McDaniels (22)
| Jayson Castro (12)
| Smart Araneta Coliseum
| 1–0
|-bgcolor=ccffcc
| 2
| September 28
| Rain or Shine
| W 103–91
| K. J. McDaniels (37)
| K. J. McDaniels (13)
| Jayson Castro (7)
| Smart Araneta Coliseum
| 2–0

|-bgcolor=ccffcc
| 3
| October 2
| Phoenix 
| W 123–118 
| McDaniels, Rosario (32) 
| K. J. McDaniels (8) 
| K. J. McDaniels (6) 
| Smart Araneta Coliseum 
| 3–0
|-bgcolor=ccffcc
| 4
| October 5
| Columbian 
| W 125–120 
| K. J. McDaniels (29) 
| K. J. McDaniels (17) 
| Castro, McDaniels (6) 
| Ynares Center 
| 4–0
|-bgcolor=ccffcc
| 5
| October 9
| NorthPort 
| W 103–100 
| K. J. McDaniels (30) 
| K. J. McDaniels (18) 
| Jayson Castro (6) 
| Cuneta Astrodome 
| 5–0
|-bgcolor=ccffcc
| 6
| October 12
| Meralco 
| W 116–113 
| K. J. McDaniels (51) 
| K. J. McDaniels (10) 
| Jayson Castro (4) 
| Smart Araneta Coliseum 
| 6–0
|-bgcolor=ccffcc
| 7
| October 18
| Alaska 
| W 99–93 (OT) 
| K. J. McDaniels (37) 
| K. J. McDaniels (13) 
| K. J. McDaniels (5) 
| Ynares Center 
| 7–0
|-bgcolor=ffcccc
| 8
| October 25
| NLEX 
| L 113–126 
| K. J. McDaniels (42) 
| K. J. McDaniels (13) 
| K. J. McDaniels (8) 
| Smart Araneta Coliseum 
| 7–1

|-bgcolor=ffcccc
| 9
| November 8
| Barangay Ginebra
| L 93–96
| K. J. McDaniels (32)
| K. J. McDaniels (12)
| K. J. McDaniels (6)
| Smart Araneta Coliseum
| 7–2
|-bgcolor=ffcccc
| 10
| November 15
| Magnolia
| L 93–100
| K. J. McDaniels (33)
| K. J. McDaniels (15)
| Bobby Ray Parks Jr. (5)
| University of Southeastern Philippines Gym
| 7–3
|-bgcolor=ccffcc
| 11
| November 20
| San Miguel
| W 114–109
| K. J. McDaniels (44)
| K. J. McDaniels (12)
| Jayson Castro (11)
| Ynares Center
| 8–3

Bracket

Transactions

Trades

Preseason

Recruited imports

Awards

References

TNT Tropang Giga seasons
TNT KaTropa